Jennie Tonkham Phonchanhueang (Lao language:ຕົ້ນຄຳ ພົນຈັນເຮືອງ; born October 10, 1995) is a Lao model, actress and beauty pageant titleholder who was crowned Miss World Laos 2017 and Miss Universe Laos 2021. She represented Laos at Miss World 2017 and Miss Universe 2021.

Pageantry

Miss World Laos 2017 
Phonchanhueang began her pageantry career representing Vientiane Prefecture in the Miss Loas World 2017 competition on August 26, 2017 at the Lao National Convention Center, where she won the title of Miss World Laos 2017. She was the first Laotian to participate at the Miss World pageant.

Miss World 2017 
As the winner of the title, Phonchanhueang represented Laos at the Miss World 2017 pageant but however, she was unplaced.

Miss Universe Laos 2021 
Four years later, Phonchanhueang returned to Miss Universe Laos and competed in Miss Universe Laos 2021. On October 31, 2021, she won the title of Miss Universe Laos 2021. She was crowned by outgoing titleholder Christina Lasasimma.

Miss Universe 2021 
Phonchanhueang represented Laos at the Miss Universe 2021 pageant on December 13, 2021 at Eilat, Israel, where she was unplaced.

References

External links

1996 births
Laotian beauty pageant winners
Laotian models
Laotian actresses
Living people
Miss Universe 2021 contestants
Miss World 2017 delegates
People from Vientiane
21st-century Laotian women